Vorharz is a Verbandsgemeinde ("collective municipality") in the Harz district, in Saxony-Anhalt, Germany. It is situated east of Halberstadt. It was created on 1 January 2010. The seat of the Verbandsgemeinde is in Wegeleben.

The Verbandsgemeinde Vorharz consists of the following municipalities:

 Ditfurt 
 Groß Quenstedt 
 Harsleben 
 Hedersleben 
 Schwanebeck
 Selke-Aue
 Wegeleben

References

Verbandsgemeinden in Saxony-Anhalt